Wind Hill, situated close to Lynmouth in Devon, England, is the location of an Iron Age enclosure or "spur" hill fort. The site is effectively a hillside forming a spur or promontory between the steep valley of the East Lyn River to the south and the cliffs to the north.

References

Hill forts in Devon
Hills of Devon
Lynton and Lynmouth